Lamin Jawo (born 15 March 1995) is a Gambian footballer who plays for Czech club Mladá Boleslav.

Career

Club career
After a trial at Vysočina Jihlava in January 2019, the club announced on 29 January, that the player had signed a contract until June 2020. On 21 January 2020, he was bought free by Czech First League club Fastav Zlín, where he signed a three-year deal. On 22 January 2023, he was bought free by Czech First League club Mladá Boleslav, where he signed a three-year deal.

References

External links

1995 births
Living people
Sportspeople from Banjul
Gambian footballers
Association football forwards
F.C. Vado players
A.C. Carpi players
A.C.N. Siena 1904 players
FeralpiSalò players
S.S.D. Sanremese Calcio players
FC Vysočina Jihlava players
FC Fastav Zlín players
Serie B players
Serie C players
Serie D players
Czech National Football League players
Czech First League players
Gambian expatriate footballers
Gambian expatriate sportspeople in Italy
Expatriate footballers in Italy
Gambian expatriate sportspeople in the Czech Republic
Expatriate footballers in the Czech Republic
FK Mladá Boleslav players